The Association of Tibetan Journalists is a Tibetan organization in exile, that was founded in 1997 in Dharamsala, India. The organization's stated mission is to "Facilitate free, fair and accurate delivering of information regarding activities relating to the Tibetan community, both within and outside of Tibet. Function as a monitoring agency of the Tibetan Government in Exile, regarding the democratic processes implemented. Ensure the welfare and professional indemnity of Tibetan journalists within their professional jurisdiction."

The current executive members:
Lhakpa Kyizom' President, Journalist of  VOA Tibetan Service
Gurbhum, Vice-president, Chinese section editor of the Voice of Tibet
Yeshe Choesang, General Secretary, editor in Chief of  Tibet Post, a Tibetan Independent News Agency.
Tenzin Wangyal, accountant, journalist of Radio Free Asia
Dhonkho, Treasure, journalist of Tibet Times

The founding members were:
Pema Dhondrup, former producer and editor of the news magazine Sargyur
Gedun Rabsal, former editor of the Tibet Times
Kunsang Paljor, journalist of the radio station Voice of Tibet
Ugyen Norbu, former journalist of Radio Free Asia
Karma Yeshi, former editor of Rangzen in Tibetan language
Pema Lhündrup, former editor of Rangzen in English
Lobsang Wangyal, independent journalist

In 2011, the Association for Tibetan Journalists was awarded a US$7243 grant from the Rowell Fund to create and publish a stylebook in the Tibetan language. The organization states that it will draw upon the Associated Press stylebook for print media and the BBC stylebook for radio.

References 

Human rights organisations based in India
Tibet
Indian journalism organisations
1997 establishments in Himachal Pradesh
Tibetan diaspora in India